Marinangeli is an Italian surname. Notable people with the surname include:

 Marco Marinangeli (born 1965), Italian composer, songwriter, arranger, orchestrator, and producer
 Nicola Marinangeli (born 2003), Italian racing driver
 Sergio Marinangeli (born 1980), Italian cyclist

Italian-language surnames